Toirano is a comune (municipality) in the Province of Savona in the Italian region Liguria, located about  southwest of Genoa and about  southwest of Savona.

Geography
Toirano borders the following municipalities: Balestrino, Bardineto, Boissano, Borghetto Santo Spirito, Castelvecchio di Rocca Barbena, and Ceriale. The town centre is located on the Varatella banks.

Main sights
Toirano Caves
Giogo di Toirano

References

External links
 

Cities and towns in Liguria